Grand Lake Towne is a town in Mayes County, Oklahoma, United States. The population was 74 at the 2010 census.

Geography

Demographics

Grand Lake Towne was first developed and incorporated in the early 1960s by George Creager of Oklahoma City.

As of June 2022, Kenneth Calhoun holds the position of Mayor and representative for the town.

As of 2010 Grand Lake Towne had a population of 74.  The median age was 55.2.  The racial and ethnic composition of the population was 77.0% white, 18.9% Native American, and 4.1% reporting being both white and Native American.  1.4% of the population was Hispanic or Latino.

As of the census of 2000, there were 65 people, 31 households, and 23 families residing in the town. There were 61 housing units at an average density of 402.2 per square mile (157.0/km2). The racial makeup of the town was 90.77% White, 7.69% Native American, and 1.54% from two or more races.

There were 31 households, out of which 19.4% had children under the age of 18 living with them, 71.0% were married couples living together, and 25.8% were non-families. 25.8% of all households were made up of individuals, and 6.5% had someone living alone who was 65 years of age or older. The average household size was 2.10 and the average family size was 2.48.

In the town, the population was spread out, with 18.5% under the age of 18, 1.5% from 18 to 24, 13.8% from 25 to 44, 43.1% from 45 to 64, and 23.1% who were 65 years of age or older. The median age was 51 years. For every 100 females, there were 91.2 males. For every 100 females age 18 and over, there were 103.8 males.

The median income for a household in the town was $39,792, and the median income for a family was $39,792. Males had a median income of $35,000 versus $31,250 for females. The per capita income for the town was $30,824. None of the population and none of the families were below the poverty line.

External links
Grand Lake Links
Grand Lake Maps

References

Towns in Mayes County, Oklahoma
Towns in Oklahoma